, also known as Dejiko or Digiko, is the main protagonist of the manga and anime of the same name created by Koge-Donbo. Dejiko is a princess of a planet that is also called Di Gi Charat, she is also depicted as a catgirl which is highlighted by her ending each sentence with the cat sound 'nyo'. Dejiko can be violent at times and will resort to using her special ability, eye-beams, to inflict damage on others. She is close friends with her sidekick Puchiko who has a contrasting personality to that of Dejiko's.

Dejiko is the company mascot of Gamers, a retail chain of Broccoli, the production company for Di Gi Charat.

Concept

In an interview with Koge-Donbo, she says that of all her character creations Dejiko is most like her.

Appearances

Manga

Anime

Dejiko has appeared in each of the Di Gi Charat anime series. In Di Gi Charat she comes to Earth with hopes of becoming an idol singer. She has green eyes and green hair and her maid-like uniform consists of a white and navy blue dress with big cat bells tied to her hair with navy blue ribbons. On the very top of her head are her cat ears, which are white with pink inside and have a set of large, non-functional lime-coloured cat eyes. She always wears white gloves and boots (with the exception of her sleeping outfit) and she has a white tail. She is consistently seen in this costume in her various series with the exception of Panyo Panyo Di Gi Charat where she wears a different costume in her chibi character design in that series.

Video games

She has appeared in two Game Boy Advance games, the Di Gi Charat: Di Gi Communication series, and three computer games: Glove on Fight, Moe Moe (as selectable character) and Kakuge Yaro (as cameo in one stage).

In other media

Dejiko has appeared in anime outside of the Di Gi Charat series in cameo roles in such anime as Galaxy Angel, Cromartie High School, Power Stone, and Akahori Gedou Hour Rabuge. In the Galaxy Angel anime, she is a newscaster working with Puchiko and in one episode, she holds her co-worker for ransom in an endless circle of staged kidnappings that began with the theft of Ranpha Franboise's ship. Dejiko face was as a mask in Koge Donbo's other work Kamichama Karin.

Reception

In a review by THEM anime the characters as a whole of the original anime series are described as cute but with "schizophrenic, sometimes homicidal personalities that just incite cringes from any sane member of the audience" Carl Kimlinger from Anime News Network gave Di Gi Charat Nyo's first DVD a review in which he describes Dejiko having a "mercenary personality and butt-scratching manners" with a "frilly-cute exterior". In the prequel Panyo Panyo Di Gi Charat, Carlo Santos from Anime News Network describes Dejiko having a temper that "adds some spice to her goody-goody nature". In contrast, in the alternate story Winter Garden where she is now twenty, Chris Beveridge from the Fandom Post describes Dejiko as a "normal young woman".

References

External links
Dejiko's Bio at Broccoli (company).
Dejiko's Bio from the prequel Panyo Panyo Di Gi Charat at Broccoli.

Anime and manga characters who can move at superhuman speeds
Anime and manga characters with superhuman strength
Child characters in anime and manga
Comics characters introduced in 1998
Di Gi Charat
Female characters in anime and manga
Female characters in advertising
Fictional extraterrestrial princesses
Kemonomimi
Mascots introduced in 1998
Catgirls